Sathio is a Sindhi tribe mainly in district Tando Muhammad Khan, Sindh. There are some families in Karachi, Hyderabad, Thatta in Pakistan as well as in India and the UK. Tribal elders believe that they are the descendants of Indo-Scythians.

See also 
 Syed Matto Shah

References

External links
T M Khan villagers conduct baseline survey and launch website

Sindhi tribes